Discogobio longibarbatus is a fish species in the genus Discogobio endemic to Fuxian Lake in China.

References

External links 

Cyprinid fish of Asia
Fish described in 1977
Discogobio